The 2021 Ferrari Challenge Europe is the 29th season of Ferrari Challenge Europe and its predecessor Ferrari Challenge Italy. The season consists of 7 rounds, starting at the Autodromo Nazionale Monza on 10 April 2021 and ending at the Autodromo Internazionale del Mugello during the Ferrari World Finals on 20 November 2021

Michelle Gatting became the first female to be crowned the overall champion of Ferrari Challenge Europe Trofeo Pirelli.

Calendar 
The season consists of 14 races run at seven different circuits in Europe.

Entry list
All teams and drivers used the Ferrari 488 Challenge Evo fitted with Pirelli tyres.

Trofeo Pirelli

Coppa Shell

Results and standings

Race results

Championship standings
Points were awarded to the top ten classified finishers as follows:

Trofeo Pirelli

Coppa Shell

References

External links
 Official website

Europe 2021
Ferrari Challenge Europe
Ferrari Challenge Europe